The Biofuels Center of North Carolina is a private, nonprofit corporate facility located on a  Biofuels Campus in Oxford, North Carolina.  The Center is funded by the North Carolina General Assembly to implement North Carolina's Strategic Plan for Biofuels Leadership   and to reduce the state's dependence on imported liquid fuel.  The Center's mission  is to develop a sustainable, statewide biofuels industry to reduce this dependence, create jobs and opportunities for prosperity for North Carolinians. The strategic goal: by 2017, 10% of North Carolina's liquid fuels—or about  a year—will be produced in-state from locally grown biomass.

The Biofuels Center of North Carolina was funded with a $5 million initial appropriation from the 2007 General Assembly. It receives continuing funding from the General Assembly to implement the Strategic Plan.

History 

The Biofuels Center of North Carolina originated from legislation introduced by N.C. Representative Jim Crawford and N.C. Senator Charlie Albertson.  The outcome of their legislative efforts was Senate Bill 2051, mandating the statewide biofuels Strategic Plan.  The companion bill in the House was House Bill 1990.  The resulting Strategic Plan was derived from input from more than 70 participants including leaders in agriculture, academia, state government, non-governmental organizations, the North Carolina Biotechnology Center, the Rural Development Center, and others.  The plan and these bills were instrumental in the creation of the Biofuels Center to meet the mandate of the Strategic Plan.  

The General Assembly demonstrated its continuing support for the mission of the Biofuels Center of North Carolina during the short session in 2008.  N.C. Representatives James W. Crawford, Jr., and Edith D. Warren introduced House Bill 2109  and N.C. Senator Doug Berger introduced Senate Bill 1655  along with nine co-sponsors to provide continuing operational funding for the Biofuels Center in the 2008/2009 fiscal year.   The support from the N.C. House and Senate ensured that the Biofuels Center was able to continue building a new biofuels industry in North Carolina.

In the 2009-2010 fiscal year, the Biofuels Center continued to receive funding from the General Assembly with a portion of its $5 million appropriation coming from U.S. Department of Energy stimulus funds.  N.C. Representatives Crawford and Ty Harrell introduced House Bill 400  and N.C. Senator Albertson introduced Senate Bill 841.

North Carolina’s Strategic Plan for Biofuels Leadership 

Almost  of petroleum-based liquid fuels are consumed by North Carolinians every year. None is produced in North Carolina.  The net effect is no revenue for North Carolina and dependence on other states and countries for fuel. 

Considering these concerns, 70 North Carolina leaders, including legislative, corporate, and academic heads, met to create a liquid biofuels industry.  To achieve this aim, they devised North Carolina's Strategic Plan for Biofuels Leadership, which comprises nine strategies.

These strategies outline the means to develop a liquid biofuels industry in North Carolina that is substantial in output, agriculturally and economically important, sustainable, and significant.   The plan combines bold vision with brevity. The 24-page document has nine realistic strategies for the Biofuels Center to implement.
Strategy 1 - Ten percent of fuels sold in NC will be locally grown and produced by 2017
Strategy 2 - Provide leadership in developing the biofuels sector
Strategy 3 - Maximize economic and rural development through sustained policy
Strategy 4 - Create the biofuels sector in North Carolina and enable the state to take a leadership role for the state in the Mid-Atlantic and Southern region
Strategy 5 - Create a plan to successfully connect feedstock growers with biofuels producers
Strategy 6 - Accelerate effective science, research, and development capabilities
Strategy 7 - Establish a nationally unique Advanced Biofuels Acceleration Facility
Strategy 8 - Develop a skilled workforce and advance public commitment to local biofuels
Strategy 9 - Identify and implement appropriate and targeted legislative incentives along the biofuels value chain.

Sustainability 

The Biofuels Center is focused on long-term sustainability.  While economic sustainability is key, environmental sustainability is critical in developing a successful industry.

Biofuels hold significant promise in increased energy security, reduced greenhouse gas emissions, and local economic development.  However, biofuels have also been criticized for their possible adverse impacts on the natural environment, food security and land use.  The Center's focus is on assessing sustainable industry development opportunities and supporting the growth of environmentally sustainable industry.  The challenge is to support biofuels development, including the development of new cellulosic technologies, with responsible policies and economic instruments to help ensure that biofuel commercialization is sustainable.

Responsible commercialization of biofuels represents an opportunity to enhance sustainable economic prospects.  The excess production and limited markets for the woody biomass resources in North Carolina provide an opportunity to develop a North Carolina biofuels industry based on woody biomass.  Currently,  of total  of the woody biomass in North Carolina is privately owned. Improved forest management practices and purpose-grown trees provide options for enhanced economics and environmental sustainability.  While it is possible to grow a number of crops in North Carolina, including energy grasses such as switchgrass and miscanthus, the Biofuel Center's primary focus is on forest resources.  Advanced biofuels from lignocellulosic feedstocks and energy crops offer an improved environmental and net energy profile compared to first-generation biofuels.

The Center is involved in a number of projects to determine the environmental impact of a number of technologies in biofuels production, which will help to guide and drive large scale biofuels developments in the state.  The Center has also partnered with the North Carolina Department of Environment and Natural Resources, which is helping to access the impact of biofuels technologies and their suitability for the long-term developments in North Carolina.

In summary, biofuels help to reduce dependency on fossil fuels, reduce green house gas emissions, and boost local economic development.  Renewable cleaner transportation fuels, combined with more efficient use of fuels, will help to develop a sustainable transportation strategy.  Carefully crafted biofuels industry strategies will help to develop a successful North Carolina biofuels industry sector while simultaneously helping to ensure sustainability of local environmental resources.

Education 

For the biofuels sector to thrive, education will need to be a key part of the infrastructure created by North Carolina.  The Biofuels Center intends on being a resource in biofuels education and training to help people wanting a career in the biofuels sector so they can easily find the education they need at schools, community colleges, and universities. The Biofuels Center will also assist in the development of targeted programs to assist technology acceleration so that this sector can stay at the cutting edge.

The role education will play was recognized during the development of North Carolina’s Strategic Plan for Biofuels Leadership, and forms a central part of Strategy 8:

Advancing Public Commitment and Workforce Development:  To ensure that North Carolinians understand the personal and societal importance of biofuels produced within their State, a coordinated statewide public endeavor undertaken by varied parties must in the next five years work for and fund informed leadership, targeted education and workforce development, and consumer awareness.

Recognizing the many stakeholders impacted by Strategy 8, the Biofuels Center held the first Strategic Convening on Biofuels Education on January 15, 2009.

The Strategic Convening was attended by representatives from North Carolina public schools, North Carolina Community College System, University System, industry, nonprofits and others.  The group discussed what needed to be done in the short- and medium-term and discussion fell into four main areas:
 Analysis
 Curriculum development
 Activities
 Educator outreach

The Biofuels Center has also developed the first liquid transportation biofuels centered wiki. The Biofuels Wiki is a one-stop, collaborative, open-source, industry-led site where knowledge about liquid renewable biofuels can be found.

External links 
 The Biofuels Wiki
 The Biofuels Center Facebook Page

References 

Bioenergy organizations
Biofuels